Magna Community Baptist Church (also known as Magna Community Church) is a historic church at 2916 S. 8900 West in Magna, Utah.  It was built during 1928-33 and was added to the National Register of Historic Places in 1986.

It was then deemed "significant as the first and only Protestant church building constructed in the town of Magna and for its important role in the religious affairs in the community."

The building has had its cupola removed and is now used as a multi-family dwelling.

References

Baptist churches in Utah
Churches on the National Register of Historic Places in Utah
Churches completed in 1924
Churches in Salt Lake County, Utah
National Register of Historic Places in Salt Lake County, Utah